The  2015 Peru bus accident occurred on 24 March 2015, when a bus crashed into traffic in Peru, leaving at least 37 people dead  and another 70 wounded.

The accident took place on the Carretera Panamericana near Huarmey, around 320 km north of Lima.

The bus, belonging to the Murga Serrano line, swerved on the incoming lane and hit a truck along with two more buses.

Related
2018 Pasamayo Bus Crash
 2013 Peru bus disaster
 2009 Espinar bus crash
 2010 Peru bus crash

References

Peru bus accident
2015 in Peru
Bus incidents in Peru